Power of Scotland: Team Scotland Men's Roller Derby represents Scotland in men's international Roller Derby in events such as the Men's Roller Derby World Cup. The team was founded in 2013 to compete in the 2014 Men's Roller Derby World Cup in Birmingham where they finished the tournament in joint 7th place.

2014 Men's Roller Derby World Cup
Power of Scotland competed in the inaugural Men's Roller Derby World Cup, held at the Futsal Arena, Birmingham, UK, 14–16 March 2014.

During the group stage on the first day of the tournament the team competed in the Orange Group against Ninjapan Rollers (PoS 247 – 73 NR), Team Belgium (PoS 98 – 82 TB) and Team Canada (PoS 18 – 220 TC). Power of Scotland finished 2nd in the group securing themselves a quarter final place in the knockout stages.

On the second day of the tournament Power of Scotland faced Team USA in the quarter finals eventually losing the bout 557–40. Having been knocked out of the main title competition the team returned on Day 3 to compete in the Plate bracket, facing off against Team Wales. The final score was Power of Scotland 123 – 245 Team Wales, signalling the end of the team's involvement in the competition.

Roster
The 2014 roster for Power of Scotland selected for the 2014 Men's Roller Derby World Cup

Players

Management Team

References

Scotland
Roller derby
Roller derby in Scotland
2013 establishments in Scotland
National sports teams established in 2013